Stec or STEC may refer to:

Science and technology
 Shigatoxigenic Escherichia coli, bacterial strains
 sTec, Inc., solid-state data storage company based in Santa Ana, California
 Daewoo S-TEC engine

People
 Stefan Stec (Polish aviator), pioneer of the Polish military aviation, credited as designer of the Polish Air Force's insignia
 Stefan Stec (UN peacekeeper), major of Polish Armed Forces
 Grzegorz Stec, Polish painter
 Thomas John Stec, master Kettle One connoisseur with less than one brain cell